The Shvab–Zeldovich formulation is an approach to remove the chemical-source terms from the conservation equations for energy and chemical species by linear combinations of independent variables, when the conservation equations are expressed in a common form. Expressing conservation equations in common form often limits the range of applicability of the formulation. The method was first introduced by V. A. Shvab in 1948 and by Yakov Zeldovich in 1949.

Method
For simplicity, assume combustion takes place in a single global irreversible reaction

Then, it can be shown from the law of mass action that the rate of moles produced per unit volume of any species  is constant and given by

The main approximation involved in Shvab–Zeldovich formulation is that all binary diffusion coefficients  of all pairs of species are the same and equal to the thermal diffusivity. In other words, Lewis number of all species are constant and equal to one. This puts a limitation on the range of applicability of the formulation since in reality, except for methane, ethylene, oxygen and some other reactants, Lewis numbers vary significantly from unity. The steady, low Mach number conservation equations for the species and energy in terms of the rescaled independent variables

The above set of  nonlinear equations, expressed in a common form, can be replaced with  linear equations and one nonlinear equation. Suppose the nonlinear equation corresponds to  so that

The linear combinations automatically removes the nonlinear reaction term in the above  equations.

Shvab–Zeldovich–Liñán formulation
Shvab–Zeldovich–Liñán formulation was introduced by Amable Liñán in 1991 for diffusion-flame problems where the chemical time scale is infinitely small (Burke–Schumann limit) so that the flame appears as a thin reaction sheet. The reactants can have Lewis number that is not necessarily equal to one.

Suppose the non-dimensional scalar equations for fuel mass fraction  (defined such that it takes a unit value in the fuel stream), oxidizer mass fraction  (defined such that it takes a unit value in the oxidizer stream) and non-dimensional temperature  (measured in units of oxidizer-stream temperature) are given by

In the Burke–Schumann limit,  leading to the equilibrium condition

.

In this case, the reaction terms on the right-hand side become Dirac delta functions. To solve this problem, Liñán introduced the following functions

Introducing these functions reduces the governing equations to

where  is the mean (or, effective) Lewis number.

On the fuel stream, since , we have . Similarly, on the oxidizer stream, since , we have .

The equilibrium condition defines

The above relations define the piecewise function  

where  is a mean Lewis number.

References

Combustion
Fluid dynamics